This is a list of extinct languages of Asia, languages which have undergone language death, have no native speakers, and no spoken descendant.

There are 114 languages listed. 8 from Central Asia, 21 from East Asia, 9 from North Asia, 14 from South Asia, 26 from Southeast Asia, 36 from West Asia.

Central Asia
Scythian languages, other than pre-Ossetic
Hunnic
Xiongnu
Khazarian
Avestan
Bactrian
Orkhon Turkic
Old Uyghur
Khwarezmian
Khorezmian
Karakhanid
Chagatai
Fergana Kipchak language

East Asia

China
Ba-Shu
Di
Jie
Khitan
Old Yue
Saka (Khotanese and Tumshuqese)
Tangut
Tocharian
Xianbei
Zhang-Zhung

Taiwan
Babuza
Basay
Favorlang
Papora-Hoanya
Luilang
Kulun
Pazeh
Siraiya
Taokas

Korea
Gaya
Buyeo
Baekje

North Asia

Siberia

 Arin
 Assan
 Kamassian
 Kott
 Mator
 Pumpokol
 Sireniki
 Yugh
 Yurats

South Asia

India
Ahom
Andamanese languages
Aka-Bea
Aka-Bo
Aka-Cari
Aka-Kede
Aka-Kol
Aka-Kora
Akar-Bale
Oko-Juwoi
Cochin Portuguese creole
Chakma (Old Chakma)/Tsaangma
Moran
Punjabi varieties
Lubanki dialect
Jangil

Sri Lanka
Ceylon Portuguese

Nepal
Dura language

Southeast Asia

Indonesia
Hukumina
Kamarian
Tambora language
Moksela language
Kayeli language
Hoti language
Nila language
Serua language
Tandia language
Ternateño language

Malaysia
Kenaboi
Wila'
Seru
Lelak
Sabüm

Philippines
Agta Dicamay
Katabaga
Ermitaño creole

Myanmar
 Pyu
 Chakma  / Tsaangma

West Asia

Anatolia
Anatolian languages
Carian
Hittite
Luwian
Lycian
Lydian
Mysian
Palaic
Galatian
Hattian
Phrygian
Urartian
Old Anatolian Turkish
Ottoman Turkish

Arabia
Old South Arabian languages
Hadramautic
Minaean
Qatabanian
Sabaean
Nabatean
Himyarite

Caucasus
Ubykh

Iranian Plateau
Azari
Elamite
Parthian
Deilami

Levant
Ammonite
Cypro-Minoan (Alashia and Ugarit)
Eblaite
Edomite
Minoan (Crete and Ugarit)
Moabite
Phoenician
Ugaritic

Mesopotamia
Akkadian
Amorite
Gutian
Hurrian
Kassite
Sumerian

See also
Languages of Asia
List of endangered languages in Asia

Asia
 
Extinct languages